Milovice may refer to several places in the Czech Republic:

Milovice, town in Nymburk District
Milovice (Břeclav District), village in Břeclav District
Milovice u Hořic, village in Jičín District

See also
Milovice Nature Reserve